Education Finance and Policy is a peer-reviewed academic journal addressing public policy developments affecting educational institutions.  Topics covered by the journal include school accountability, education standards, teacher compensation, instructional policy, higher education productivity and finance, and special education.  Education Finance and Policy was founded in 2005 and is published online and in hard copy by the MIT Press and the American Education Finance Association. It is also indexed with EconLit.

External links 
 
American Education Finance Association (AEFA)
EconLit

Education journals
Finance journals
MIT Press academic journals
Publications established in 2005
English-language journals
Quarterly journals
Academic journals associated with learned and professional societies